Ptolemaeus son of Glaucias (fl. 2nd century B.C) was a katochos (an unclear word roughly translatable as hermit) who lived in the Temple of Astarte in the Serapeum at Memphis, Egypt for 20 years. Many details about his life and associates, such as his younger brother Apollonius, are known thanks to the survival of an extensive archive of papyri belonging to the katochoi of the temple.

Katoche

Ptolemaeus was born in approximately 200 BC. He was the eldest of four sons of a certain Glaucias, a Macedonian lot-holder at the village of Psichis in the Heracleopolite nome. Around 172, he began a period of twenty years as a katochos of the Temple of Astarte. The meaning of katochos is unclear, but it entailed a strict restriction against leaving the temple. In the summer of 158, Ptolemaeus was joined by his adolescent brother Apollonius, who learned to read and write before joining the Ptolemaic army and later becoming a police informant.

Ptolemaeus had custody of three Egyptian girls who lived in asylia in the temple: the twins Thages and Thaous and their probable sister Tathemis. According to Ptolemaeus, their mother and her Greek lover had sought to kill the twins' father, a friend of Ptolemaeus. Their father died soon afterwards and their mother took possession of his property, forcing the twins to flee to the temple. There they performed the sacred funerary rites of the Apis bull, for which a pair of twins was conveniently needed to play the roles of Isis and Nephthys. Due to his katoche, Ptolemaeus relied on an Egyptian agent, Harmais, and two therapeutae, Diphilos and Nikanor, who were able to leave the temple area unlike the katochoi.

Ptolemaeus wrote numerous petitions to various officials during his katoche, including Ptolemy VI Philometor and Cleopatra II. He often appealed to the strategos of his nome, Dionysios, about injustices and crimes committed against him, including an occasion on which he claimed to have been nearly murdered by a mob for being a Greek. He also recorded his dreams and those of the twins, which were regarded as having prophetic significance.

See also
 Horos son of Nechoutes
 Dryton and Apollonia archive

References 

2nd-century BC Egyptian people
2nd-century BC Macedonians
Egyptian hermits